Liosphex is a genus of wasps in family Rhopalosomatidae. Members of this family are parasitic of crickets.

Taxonomy
The genus contains the following species:
Liosphex achuar Lohrmann, 2010 
Liosphex atratus Lohrmann, 2010
Liosphex boreus Lohrmann, 2010
Liosphex bribri Lohrmann, 2010
Liosphex darien Lohrmann, 2010
Liosphex guanabara Lohrmann, 2010
Liosphex guarani Lohrmann, 2010
Liosphex longicornis Lohrmann, 2010
Liosphex maleku Lohrmann, 2010
Liosphex micropterus Lohrmann, 2010
Liosphex quechua Lohrmann, 2010
Liosphex trichopleurum Townes, 1977 
Liosphex tupi Lohrmann, 2010
Liosphex varius Townes, 1977

References

Rhopalosomatidae
Hymenoptera genera